KMZO (90.7 FM) is a radio station licensed to serve Hamilton, Montana, USA. The station is owned by Faith Communications Corp. and broadcasts a Contemporary Christian music format, including religious programming from the SOS Radio Network.

The station was assigned the KMZO call letters by the Federal Communications Commission on August 13, 2002.

Translators

References

External links
Sounds of the Spirit Radio Network

Contemporary Christian radio stations in the United States
Ravalli County, Montana
Radio stations established in 2002
2002 establishments in Montana
MZO